Maldegem, earlier spelled Maldeghem,  is a municipality located in the Belgian province of East Flanders. On 1 January 2018, Maldegem had a total population of 
23,689.

The Stoomcentrum Maldegem is located at the former NMBS railway station at Maldegem.

World War II airfield

An airfield established in 1939 near Maldegem was taken over by the invading German army in 1940 and used by the Luftwaffe. Seized by British Forces in September 1944, it was designated "Advanced Landing Ground B-65".

Notable inhabitants
 Joanna Courtmans (1811–1890), writer

International relations

Twin towns — Sister cities
Maldegem is twinned with the following towns:

 Adria, Italy
 Świdnica, Poland
 Ermont, France
 Wierden, Netherlands
 Lampertheim, Germany

References

External links

 

 
Municipalities of East Flanders
Populated places in East Flanders